FASB Interpretations are published by the Financial Accounting Standards Board (FASB). They extend or explain existing standards (primarily published in Statements of Financial Accounting Standards). Interpretations are a part of the U.S. Generally accepted accounting principles (US GAAP). 48 interpretations have been published as of September 2006.

External links
 U.S. Generally accepted accounting principles
 Financial Accounting Standards Board
 FASB Interpretations - Full Text, Summary, and Status

United States Generally Accepted Accounting Principles
Financial Accounting Standards Board